Larger than Life is a 1960 novel by the Italian writer Dino Buzzati. It tells the story of a scientist who becomes entangled with a large electronic machine in which the woman he loves is reincarnated. The book is considered to be the first serious novel of Italian science fiction, with content that goes beyond light entertainment. An English translation by Henry Reed was published in 1962.

Reception
"Sergeant Cuff" of The Saturday Review called the book "a read-at-a-sitting parable with science-fiction overtones" and described it as "skillfully put together".

References

External links

 Publicity page at the Italian publisher's website 

1960 novels
1960 science fiction novels
Italian science fiction novels
Italian-language books
Novels by Dino Buzzati
20th-century Italian novels
Arnoldo Mondadori Editore books